This is a list of settlements in the province of South Holland, in the Netherlands.

Sources 
GEOnet Names Server (GNS)

 
South Holland